Korukkupet railway station is one of the railway station of the Chennai Central–Gummidipoondi section of the Chennai Suburban Railway Network. It serves the neighbourhood of Korukkupet, a suburb of Chennai, and is located 4 km north of Chennai Central railway station. It has an elevation of 7 m above sea level.

History
Korukkupet railway station is the first railway station located north of the diamond junction of the city's railway network. The lines at the station were electrified on 13 April 1979, with the electrification of the Chennai Central–Gummidipoondi section.

Developments
In 2007, a road overbridge project to replace the level crossing No. 1 was sanctioned at a cost of  140 million. Work commenced in 2009, and is expected to be completed by end 2012.

However, the station lacks several basic facilities.

See also

 Chennai Suburban Railway
 Railway stations in Chennai

References

External links
 Korukkupet station at Indiarailinfo.com

Stations of Chennai Suburban Railway
Railway stations in Chennai